Old Mill Falls is a waterfall located in the Catskill Mountains of New York. It is within Platte Clove and the first falls on the Plattekill Creek.

References

Waterfalls of New York (state)
Landforms of Greene County, New York
Tourist attractions in Greene County, New York